The Peterborough sex abuse case involved 10 men who committed sexual offences against under-aged girls, some as young as 12, in the English city of Peterborough, Cambridgeshire. In a series of trials in 2014 and 2015, they were found guilty of rape, child prostitution and trafficking for sexual exploitation. Police had been alerted by the Rotherham and Rochdale child abuse cases to the possibility of abuse taking place.

Crimes
The victims were of Czech, Slovak and English origin and typically vulnerable girls, some in local authority care, who were groomed with gifts of tobacco, free meals and apparent displays of affection and friendship by the older males who were targeting them. They were then persuaded to drink vodka or other strong alcoholic drinks and coerced into sexual acts. Some were subsequently trafficked as child prostitutes. The man whose activity prompted the police operation, Mohammed Khubaib, a 43-year-old restaurant-owner of Pakistani heritage, was described during his trial at the Old Bailey as having a "'persistent and almost predatory interest' in teenage girls". Khubaib also owned a lettings agency and took under-aged girls to flats under his control, where he and his friends would give them alcohol and play them sexually explicit music videos as part of the sexual grooming.

Perpetrators
10 men were convicted from operation Erle:

Reaction
Cambridgeshire Constabulary welcomed the convictions and praised the courage of the victims in giving evidence at the trials. A police spokesman said that police had "made great efforts to safeguard these young people, win their confidence and explore what they told us" and noted that the "victim-led" investigation, a joint initiative by Cambridgeshire police and Peterborough city council, had "formally beg[u]n in early January 2013". The Rotherham and Rochdale child abuse cases, had alerted police and council officials to the possibility that similar abuse was happening in the Peterborough area. One of Khubaib's victims said in a victim impact statement: "It was disgusting what he did to me. Before that happened, I was a typical 13-year-old who didn't know any better and thought that Mohammed was my friend who I had under my thumb. Now I know that he was the one with the control." A spokesman for the National Society for the Prevention of Cruelty to Children (NSPCC), a national charity campaigning for child welfare, said: "No child should experience what these girls have been through. Mohammed Khubaib subjected them to appalling ordeals but he will now have to pay for his crimes as a result of the victims' bravery in giving evidence."

See also
List of sexual abuses perpetrated by groups

References

Child prostitution in the United Kingdom
Crime in Cambridgeshire
Forced prostitution
History of Peterborough
Rape in England
Pakistani-British gangs
Child sexual abuse in England
Incidents of violence against girls